Our Game (a term similar to the Great Game) is a novel by British writer John le Carré, published in 1995. The title refers to Winchester College football; the two main characters were pupils at Winchester College long before the setting of the novel.

Plot summary
The disappearance of Dr. Larry Pettifer, a British intelligence operative, from his teaching position at Bath University should not have concerned a great many people, especially a retired Treasury boffin like Tim Cranmer.  But when Detective Inspector Bryant and Sergeant Luck of the Bath Police call upon Cranmer at his Somerset manor house and vineyard late on a Sunday evening, Cranmer finds himself facing repercussions from his secret and not-too-distant past.  Pettifer was a British Secret Intelligence Service operative during the Cold War and Cranmer was his handler for twenty years.

The Cold War is over; the Berlin Wall has come down; and SIS has put Cranmer and his agent Pettifer out to pasture.  Pettifer turns to teaching at Bath University and Cranmer is content to settle at Honeybrook, his inherited estate in Somerset, making wine and making love to his beautiful young mistress de jour, Emma.  Not content with staying cloistered in Bath, Larry begins paying visits to Honeybrook and soon becomes a permanent fixture in their lives.  At least, that is, until both Larry and Emma disappear into thin air.

Panicked by his encounter with the Bath Police, Cranmer contacts his former employers and is summoned to London where he learns that, not only has Larry disappeared, he has absconded with some £37 million milked from the Russian Government with the help of a former Soviet spy.  Cranmer finds himself suspected as Larry's accomplice by the Bath Police—and, later, by "The Office", or SIS—and decides to track down his protégé and his former mistress.

But why would a quixotic intellectual like Larry, a man who had no interest in money, suddenly wish to steal £37 million from the Russians?  To solve this mystery, Cranmer begins calling on old contacts from Oxford to the arms trade to find out what his former agent and his purloined mistress have been up to in their disappearance.  He also visits his secret archive of Office files, stashed away in the abandoned church of St. James the Less, bequeathed to him by the same Uncle Bob who left him Honeybrook.  As he peruses his cache of documents, he begins to uncover the plot between Larry and Constantin Checheyev, also known as "C.C.", the former Soviet handler of Larry (the latter one pretended to work for the Soviets during the Cold War).  Checheyev, it seems, is not Russian but an Ingush, a native of the North Caucasus and begrudged of the Russians who have displaced him and his people from their rightful homes.  The Ingush are primed for an uprising against their Russian oppressors and Larry's the man to arm them.

Cranmer begins his journey, first to an arms dealer in Macclesfield, whom he finds murdered along with his assistants by an Ossetian group called "The Forest"; then to find Emma, who has sought shelter in Paris; then to Russia to track down his former Soviet contacts in hopes of finding Larry; then to Ingushetia to find his friend and try to save him—from the Russians, the Ossetians, and from himself. Finally, Tim Cranmer grabs his AK-47 and joins the Ingush rebels.

References

1995 British novels
Hodder & Stoughton books
Novels by John le Carré
British spy novels
Secret Intelligence Service in fiction